Vedalam is a 2015 Indian Tamil-language action film written and directed by Siva. It stars Ajith Kumar, Lakshmi Menon and Shruti Hassan while Ashwin Kakumanu, Rahul Dev, Thambi Ramaiah, Kabir Duhan Singh, and Soori play supporting roles. The movie focuses on an ex-mercenary who protects his sister from a powerful criminal syndicate.

The project was announced in mid-2014 after the success of Ajith and Siva's previous collaboration, Veeram, where in October 2014, Rathnam was announced to lead the production. The team underwent significant changes with the film's cast and crew, and the completion of Kumar's other film, Yennai Arindhaal, delayed the film's production. The principal photography of the film began on 9 April 2015, with filming taking place in major portions across Kolkata, and also in Chennai and Milan, Italy, and was completed that October. The film began production under the working title Thala 56, before Vedalam was officially announced in September 2015.

The film features music composed by Anirudh Ravichander. The cinematography and editing were done by Vetri and Ruben, respectively. Vedalam was released worldwide on 10 November 2015 to mixed reviews. The film grossed around 120–125.7 crore at the box office upon its release and was a profitable venture for the traders and exhibitors. It was remade in Bengali as Sultan: The Saviour in 2018. A Telugu remake, Bhola Shankar, is made by Chiranjeevi and started production in 2021.

Plot
Ganesh arrives at Kolkata with his sister Thamizh to enroll her in an arts college, where he becomes friends with "Kolkata" Kaali, who escorts Ganesh and Tamizh to their new house. After enrolling Thamizh, Ganesh works at a taxi company under his boss Laxmidas. He gets his first customer: Swetha, who makes Ganesh pose as a fake mute eyewitness in a case, and is fired when Ganesh talks in front of everyone. Swetha tries to kill Ganesh, but Laxmidas saves him, though he ends up being embarrassed by Ganesh. Shwetha and Laxmidas teams up to take revenge on Ganesh, but she falls for Ganesh afterwards. Meanwhile, Ganesh arranges Tamizh's marriage with Swetha's brother Arjun.

Ganesh and the other drivers are called in by the DCP Yashpal and asked to report any activities by the crime syndicate members who have been causing trouble in the city. Ganesh reports a case of arms trafficking, which leads to Aniket and his men capturing him. Aniket orders his men to kill Ganesh, but are instead killed by Ganesh. Learning the death of his brother, Abhinay reaches India and investigates the murder the next day. He and his technical crew track Ganesh's mobile signal to their own building. Ganesh enters the building and ambushes the entire squad and kills Abhinay. Swetha follows Ganesh and is horrified by his actions, where she proceeds to stop the marriage between Arjun and Thamizh, but Ganesh reveals that Thamizh is not his biological sister.

Ganesh reveals his real name as Vedalam, a mercenary-for-hire who was stabbed by his enemies, but was rescued by Thamizh, where she admitted him into the hospital, lying that she is his sister to get him through. Thamizh and her blind parents were threatened to sell their house for a company site, where she and her friend Ester hire Vedalam, who betrayed them having being paid earlier, and the family left their home and started living in Vedalam's home. However, Thamizh and her parents left after Vedalam had saved Thamizh and the other girls from being trafficked by the syndicate. The syndicate find them vulnerable on the streets and killed Thamizh's parents and injure her. Vedalam rescued Thamizh (who loses her memory) and stated that he is her brother and took care of her.

After narrating the events, Ganesh/Vedalam tells Swetha not to reveal this to Thamizh, where  Shwetha accepts Thamizh's marriage. After learning his brothers death, Rahul uses an injured victim of Ganesh/Vedalam's assault to find his brother's killer. Rahul coincidentally hires Thamizh to draw a forensic sketch. Ganesh/Vedalam comes prepared and takes one of Rahul's henchman's son hostage to ensure Thamizh's freedom. Rahul abducts Thamizh and Ganesh/Vedalam chases after him. Ganesh/Vedalam and Rahul fight and when an anguished Thamizh urges to shoot Rahul, Ganesh/Vedalam picks up the gun and shoots in the wrong direction for distracting Thamizh and shoots Rahul. Ganesh/Vedalam rescues Thamizh, who gets happily married to Arjun.

Cast

 Ajith Kumar as Ganesh a.k.a. Vedalam
 Lakshmi Menon as Thamizharasi a.k.a. Thamizh
 Shruti Haasan as Advocate Shweta
 Ashwin Kakumanu as Arjun
 Rahul Dev as Rahul
 Kabir Duhan Singh as Abhinay, Rahul's first younger brother
 Aniket Chouhan as Aniket, Rahul's second younger brother
 Soori as Laxmidas
 Rajendran as "Kolkata" Kaali
 Thambi Ramaiah as Thamizh's blind father
 Mayilswamy as Ganesh's house owner in kolkata
 Sudha as Gomathi
 Appukutty as Kuzhandai
 Avinash as Rahul's assistant
 Mansoor Ali Khan as Manimaran
 Vidyullekha Raman as Esther
 Raviraj as Shweta's and Arjun's father
 Yogi Babu as Chatterjee
 Sriranjini as Shweta's and Arjun's mother
 Sharmila Thapa as Lakshmi
 Kovai Sarala as Maalu

Production

Development
Following the success of their previous collaboration Veeram (2014), Siva announced that he would direct Ajith Kumar again in May 2014, with the planned venture announced to begin after the completion of Kumar's prior commitments with Yennai Arindhaal. Siva worked on the script in Bangalore and approached leading production companies, including PVP Cinema, to produce the film, though A. M. Rathnam announced that he would finance the project in October 2014. It was announced that Kumar would romance two heroines in the film. The makers announced that the film would begin production in the first week of February 2015, but production was delayed because Kumar took a two-month break to spend time with his wife Shalini. In mid-February 2015, Siva reported to the media stating that Kumar would have a new look in the film. Siva scouted locations in March 2015, with Kolkata being served as the primary location. The film was developed with the tentative title Thala 56, before it was confirmed that it would be titled as Vedalam in September 2015.

Casting
During October 2014, Hansika Motwani, Samantha Akkineni, and Shruti Haasan were reported to play female leads. Motwani denied reports that she had signed on to appear in the film in the same month. In November 2014, it was reported that Yuvan Shankar Raja, who worked with Kumar in several projects, was speculated to compose the music for the film. Later G. V. Prakash Kumar was reported to be on board. On 11 March 2015, Anirudh Ravichander was hired to compose the music, and it was officially confirmed on 19 March 2015.  The same day, Shruti Haasan was signed on to the project. Vetri, who worked previously with Siva in Veeram, and Ruben were hired. On 1 April 2015, Kabir Duhan Singh was cast as the antagonist. Aniket Chouhan played younger brother of Kabir Duhan Singh. Aniket was Introduce by Roshan Pathak Casting Director 

The role of Ganesh's sister in the film took considerably longer to finalise, with several actresses having been approached to portray the character. On 6 April 2015, Bindu Madhavi was rumoured to play the second leading role, but she denied the allegations. Sri Divya and Nithya Menen were considered to play Ganesh's sister, with the latter saying she was only interested in playing the lead actress opposite Kumar. After further unsuccessful negotiations with Parvathy Nair, Lakshmi Menon was cast to play the role of Ganesh's sister in April 2015. Santhanam, who initially signed a comic role in the film, was replaced by Soori after he became busy with his own productions. Ashwin was also added to the cast as a supporting role on 1 June 2015.

Filming
Principal photography began on 9 April 2015, with scenes intermittently shot for the rest of the month. The first official schedule began shooting in Navalur, Chennai, with scenes featuring Kumar and Menon entering a college. Subsequent scenes were shot around sets at Binny Mills in Chennai on 7 May 2015, and on 18 May, a song resembling Vinayagar Chathurthi celebration, featuring Kumar, Menon, Mayilswamy, and 150 dancers, was also shot at the same location. Sources reported that the song is similar to "Pillayarpatti Hero" from Vaanmathi (1996) and "Maha Ganapathi" from Amarkalam (1999). Stills from the song were leaked into the internet.

The team moved to Kolkata and scenes were shot featuring Haasan as a lawyer and Kumar as a taxi driver, with images from the shoot leaked on social networking sites. The makers announced that the producers went on location scouting at Dubai with 30% of the shoot being completed. However, the government had denied permission to shoot in Dubai, citing the month-long Ramzan celebrations from mid-June 2015. The unit then moved to shoot few scenes and a song sequence in Milan, Italy featuring Kumar and Haasan. The team moved to Kolkata in July 2015.

The unit returned to Chennai in August 2015 to film in Chennai, and Rahul Dev joined the project. Scenes were shot at Ramee Mall and a special set was erected at AVM Studios in Vadapalani, Guindy Race Course, and Fortis Malar Hospital, featuring Kumar and Haasan. The team also filmed night shots and few climax scenes. The team finished production in mid-October 2015 after making finishing touches on a song. Kumar was injured on the final day of the shoot, causing a minor delay. Despite his injury, Kumar immediately dubbed for the film to ensure that it would release to coincide with Diwali in November 2015.

Music

The film's soundtrack was composed by Anirudh Ravichander, collaborating with Kumar and Siva for the first time. The album featured four songs written by Madhan Karky, Rokesh, Viveka, and Siva, and a theme track, though media falsely reported the film had five songs. On 1 May 2015, Anirudh announced on social media that the introduction song and theme music for the film was completed. "Veera Vinayaka", the introductory number is based on the Vinayagar Chathurthi celebrations, and is similar to "Maha Ganapathi" from Amarkalam (1999) and "Pillayarpatti Hero" from Vaanmathi (1996). The theme track of the film is rumoured to be titled "Verithanam" which was disproven. The album featured songs recorded by Haasan, and Badshah. The audio rights were purchased by Sony Music. The film's incomplete track list featuring the song titles was released through Anirudh's Twitter account on 12 October 2015, and the official track list was revealed after two days. It was reported that the soundtrack album would be released during the composer's birthday on 16 October 2015, but it was released on 21 October 2015 instead, coinciding with Dusshera.

Release

Theatrical
In May 2015, Rathnam confirmed that the film would be released on Diwali, 10 November 2015. The film's title was expected to be announced on Independence Day, 15 August 2015. On 23 September 2015, Kumar's manager Suresh Chandraa officially confirmed via Twitter that the title and the first screening would release on midnight, which confirmed the title to be Vedalam.

The film received a U certificate from the Central Board of Film Certification with a runtime of 157 minutes, and also became eligible for entertainment tax exemption. Prior to the official release, the introductory scenes and songs were leaked onto the Internet. The film opened in 62 screens in the UK, being the widest release in the country and 80 screens in the United States, on 9 November 2015, a day before release in India. The film released on 10 November 2015, clashing with Thoongavanam.

Distribution
The film was sold across India and abroad in September 2015. In India, Jazz Cinemas and Sushma Cine Arts acquired the Tamil Nadu theatrical rights. The Karnataka rights of the film was bought by Gokulraj of Sri Gokul Films. K.G. Nair of Shenoy films has bought the distribution rights of Kerala. For overseas rights, MM Media acquired the distribution rights for the film in the USA. Ayngaran International has bought the distribution rights in UK & France.

Marketing
The teaser trailer of the film was released on the midnight of 7 October 2015. The producers planned to release the trailer of the film on 22 October 2015 to coincide with Dusshera, but there was no trailer release; instead, audio teasers of the songs "Aaluma Doluma" and "Veera Vinayaka" were released on 25 and 30 October, respectively.

Home media
The satellite rights of the film were sold to Jaya TV. The film's television premiere took place on 5 September 2016, coinciding with Ganesh Chathurthi.

Reception

Critical response
M. Suganth of The Times of India rated the film 3 out of 5 and called it "A packaged mass entertainer for Ajith fans and family audiences". Sify gave a rating of 3 out of 5 and stated, "Vedhalam is Ajith's one man show and it might enthrall his ardent fans for others, it's a formulaic film with few enjoyable moments." Indiaglitz rated the film 3 out of 5, calling it an "enjoyable mass entertainer". Avinash Gopinath from Filmibeat gave the film 3.5 out of 5 stars and concluded, "Though this movie suffers from logical loopholes and melodramatic sequences, it gets saved by Ajith and director Siva's propaganda that puts human values before money, which makes Vedalam watchable." Behindwoods rated the film 2.5 out of 5, stating, "Vedalam – Sparks do fly but not frequently enough." Gauthaman Bhaskaran of the Hindustan Times gave 1.5 out of 5 stars and stated "Vedalam is but an Ajith Kumar show (all the way where Menon and Haasan are wasted). The man arrives with a big bang and never tires of bashing up baddies -- but now and then taking a break to cleanse society of minor evils like fooling law courts or cheating on wives. Certainly not for children, who might wonder how Phantom sprung out of their favourite comic books in such a horrifically mutated form." India Today gave the film a rating of 2.5 out of 5 stars and stated "Siruthai Siva has worked the "mass" image of Ajith in Vedalam and the family sentiments to his advantage. In the process, he has not cared much about logic, which goes right out of the window." News18 gave the film 2 out of 5 and stated "'Vedalam' is another star vehicle that rides with expectations and mutilations." Sudhir Srinivasan of The Hindu said that "Vedalam needed more inventive storytelling, and seems too forced, too easy, too mawkish". Anupama Subramanian of Deccan Chronicle gave the film 2 out of 5 stars and stated, "This Ajith starrer largely depends on the mass appeal and star power of the actor with a script sans solid content and logic and just tailor-made by for him. Though the story travels in predictable lines, it has high-octane stunt sequences, bro-sis sentiment, and loads of punch lines, hit songs to satisfy the mass audiences." Daily News and Analysis gave a review stating "Director Siruthai Siva has ensured that there is plenty for Ajith fans and the family audience. Ajith has punch dialogues, high octane action sequences and all the right dance moves. He plays the good and the bad with ease and is a treat to watch on screen. The sister sentiment (the story revolves around Tamizh) and the fact that men need to respect women is a major highlight in the film. The storyline may not be new for Tamil cinema, but the director has tailor-made it for Ajith and the mass audience."

Box office
Vedalam opened to 95% occupancy on Diwali, despite clashing with Thoongavanam. On the second day, the film had collected . The film had collected more than 50 crore worldwide within six days of release. Within 11 days of its release, the film had collected 100 crore worldwide. On 23 November 2015, trade analyst Ramesh Bala stated that the film had earned a major revenue of 60% from Tamil Nadu, with 12% from Karnataka, Kerala and rest of India, 10% from Malaysia, and 18% from rest of the overseas. At the Chennai box office, the film's performance had been affected due to the 2015 South Indian Floods.

According to International Business Times, the film had grossed  worldwide, as of February 2016.

Remakes
Shortly after the film success, Rathnam wanted to remake the film in Kannada and Telugu, with Puneeth Rajkumar and Darshan reprising Kumar's role in the former, while the latter had Pawan Kalyan playing the lead role. Although the Kannada version never finished, the Telugu version had Chiranjeevi playing the lead, replacing Kalyan, and was reported to be directed by Meher Ramesh under the title Bhola Shankar. In 2018, Raja Chanda remade the film in Bengali as Sultan: The Saviour, with Jeet playing the lead role. In September 2019, T-Series acquired the Hindi remake rights of Vedalam, and announced the film would feature John Abraham in the lead role, directed by Rohit Dhawan.

In popular culture
Kumar's transformation and the following fight scene is parodied in Thamizh Padam 2.

Notes

References

External links
 

2015 films
2015 action films
2010s masala films
2010s Tamil-language films
Films about child trafficking in India
Films about human trafficking in India
Films directed by Siva (director)
Films scored by Anirudh Ravichander
Films set in Kolkata
Films shot in Italy
Films shot in Kolkata
Indian action films
Tamil films remade in other languages